Princess Savivanh Savang Manivong (1933 – 4 January 2007, Nice) was the daughter of King Savang Vatthana and Queen Khamphoui.  She was educated in Luang Prabang, France and England, the princess served in the court of her father, the King of Laos, until the fall of the monarchy to communist forces in 1975. She went into exile in the city of Nice, France, where continued to politically pressure the communist government to provide human rights for women in Laos.

Quotes
“Currently, we Lao women have securely settled down in third countries; however, I am thinking of those of us who are still left behind in our homeland and have to face daily struggles and difficulties in their lives. They have to do what it takes for them, and their families to survive. In addition, there are alarming new threats to Lao women such as AIDS, and drugs which are spreading widely in Laos.”

External links
Princess Calls For Focus on Plight of Lao Women

References

1933 births
2007 deaths
Laotian royalty
Laotian exiles
Daughters of kings